Paraphrase E is one of a series of avant-garde drawings called paraphrases by Ado Vabbe in the Tartu Art Museum.

The drawing shows a set of lines that act as partial contours of possible images, such as faces and the rear end of a horse. Ado Vabbe was the first to bring abstraction to Estonia after studying with Vassily Kandinsky and Franz Marc in Munich during the years 1911-1923. The German Expressionist Group Der Blaue Reiter was to have a great influence on his own work, and his "paraphrases" influenced young artists in Estonia.

References 

Paraphrase A in Europeana website
Paraphrase A/B
Paraphrase III
Paraphrase C/D
Paraphrase Pea

1910s in art
Estonian art